102nd Regiment of Foot may refer to:

102nd Regiment of Foot (Royal Madras Fusiliers) raised by the East India Company in 1742 and absorbed by the British Army in 1862.
102nd Regiment of Foot (Queen's Royal Volunteers), raised in 1760
102nd Regiment of Foot (1781), raised in 1781
102nd Regiment of Foot (Irish Rangers), raised in 1794
102nd Regiment of Foot, or New South Wales Corps, raised in 1789

See also
 102nd Regiment (disambiguation)